Bennwihr is a commune in Grand Est, in northeastern France.

History
Bennwihr figures in a report from the year 777 by Charlemagne's missi dominici. They refer to the village as Beno Villare (Beno's domain), and mention the quality of its wines.

The village was leveled in December 1944 during fighting leading up to the battle known as the Colmar Pocket.

See also
 Communes of the Haut-Rhin department

References

Communes of Haut-Rhin